Greenland Township is a civil township of Ontonagon County in the U.S. state of Michigan. The population was 628 at the 2020 census.

Communities
Greenland is an unincorporated community in the township.
Maple Grove is an unincorporated community in the township.
Mass City is an unincorporated community in the township.

Geography

Demographics
As of the census of 2000, there were 870 people, 378 households, and 246 families residing in the township.  The population density was 7.7 per square mile (3.0/km2).  There were 535 housing units at an average density of 4.7 per square mile (1.8/km2).  The racial makeup of the township was 96.90% White, 0.34% Native American, 0.34% from other races, and 2.41% from two or more races. Hispanic or Latino of any race were 1.26% of the population.

There were 378 households, out of which 24.9% had children under the age of 18 living with them, 56.1% were married couples living together, 5.0% had a female householder with no husband present, and 34.7% were non-families. 30.7% of all households were made up of individuals, and 16.9% had someone living alone who was 65 years of age or older.  The average household size was 2.30 and the average family size was 2.86.

In the township the population was spread out, with 22.8% under the age of 18, 4.5% from 18 to 24, 24.8% from 25 to 44, 30.1% from 45 to 64, and 17.8% who were 65 years of age or older.  The median age was 43 years. For every 100 females, there were 115.3 males.  For every 100 females age 18 and over, there were 115.4 males.

The median income for a household in the township was $31,574, and the median income for a family was $37,917. Males had a median income of $30,865 versus $20,096 for females. The per capita income for the township was $16,152.  About 3.6% of families and 7.4% of the population were below the poverty line, including 12.6% of those under age 18 and 8.7% of those age 65 or over.

Climate
This climatic region is typified by large seasonal temperature differences, with warm to hot (and often humid) summers and cold (sometimes severely cold) winters.  According to the Köppen Climate Classification system, Greenland has a humid continental climate, abbreviated "Dfb" on climate maps.

References

Townships in Ontonagon County, Michigan
Townships in Michigan